Mayes is a surname. Notable people with the surname include:

 Adrian Mayes (born 1980), American football player
 Alan Mayes (born 1953), English footballer
 Bernard Mayes (1929–2014), British-American lecturer and author
 Clifford Mayes (born 1953), American professor of education
 Clyde Mayes (born 1953), American professional basketball player 
 Colin Mayes (born 1948), Canadian politician
 Derrick Mayes (born 1974), American football player 
 Frances Mayes (born 1940), American university professor, poet, memoirist, essayist, and novelist
 Ian Mayes, British journalist and editor
 Jeff Mayes (born 1971), American politician
 Joel B. Mayes (died 1891), Chief of the Cherokee Nation 
 Johnny Mayes (born 1947), Australian rugby league player
 Pete Mayes (1938–2008), American blues singer, guitarist and songwriter
 Richard Mayes (1922–2006), English stage and television actor
 Robert Burns Mayes (1867–1921), justice of the Supreme Court of Mississippi
 Ron Mayes (born 1954), American educator and author
 Rueben Mayes (born 1963), Canadian football player
 Rufus Mayes (born 1947), American football player
 Samuel Houston Mayes (1845–1927), Chief of the Cherokee Nation from 1895 to 1899
 Sean Mayes (1949–1995), English rock musician and author
 Wendell Wise Mayes Jr. (1924–2021), American radio and cable television executive
 William Mayes Jr., prominent pirate, proprietor of White Horse Tavern (Rhode Island) 
 William Edward Mayes (1861–1952), English painter

See also
 Mays (disambiguation)
 Maze (disambiguation)
 Maize (disambiguation)
 Mais (disambiguation)
 Maye (disambiguation)